Clerodendrum floribundum, known as the lolly bush or smooth clerodendrum, is a shrub or tree found in Australia and New Guinea. The habitat is in or at the margins of coastal rainforests, up to 300 metres above sea level. In Western Australia it grows in drier areas; such as rocky sites, gorges, cliffs, floodplains and creek beds.

The leaves may be drawn into a blunt tip, a prickle or a sharp tip. They are variable in shape, usually 4 to 15 cm long, 2 to 6 cm wide. The young leaves are not as hairy as with the related downy chance. The generic term Clerodendrum is from the Greek, meaning "lottery tree". The term "lottery" refers to an unsure possibility of a medicinal value from plants of this genus. The specific epithet floribundum refers to the abundance of flowers in showy heads. The fruit is a black drupe, growing on an enlarged red fleshy calyx. It appears glossy and succulent, giving rise to the common name  "lolly bush".

Usually a small tree, however it has been recorded at 30 metres tall with a stem diameter of 30 cm at Booyong Flora Reserve, in northern New South Wales. White fragrant flowers form in cymes between September and December.

There is some debate whether this plant is found in rainforests of the Illawarra. A.G.Floyd says it is found as far south as Batemans Bay and growing north to Cape York at the northernmost point of the continent. Then west through the Northern Territory and Western Australia. However, the Royal Botanic Gardens, Sydney say records in the far south east may not be accurate.

The leaves are host to the caterpillar of the Fiery Jewel Butterfly.

Regeneration is from fresh seeds or cuttings. It is an easy plant to grow, requiring plenty of water. In 1810, this species first appeared in scientific literature, in the Prodromus Florae Novae Hollandiae, authored by the prolific Scottish botanist, Robert Brown. Originally collected on the voyage of Captain Cook's ship, the Endeavour.

Several varieties appear in publications, such as:

 Clerodendrum floribundum var. floribundum
 Clerodendrum floribundum var. attenuatum
 Clerodendrum floribundum var. latifolium
 Clerodendrum floribundum var. coriaceum
 Clerodendrum floribundum var. angustifolium

References

Ornamental trees
Flora of New South Wales
Flora of Queensland
Flora of the Northern Territory
Eudicots of Western Australia
Flora of New Guinea
floribundum
Trees of Australia
Plants described in 1810
Taxa named by Robert Brown (botanist, born 1773)